Karin Ann-Marie Söder (née Bergenfur; 30 November 1928 – 19 December 2015) was a Swedish Centre politician. She was the first woman in Sweden to be elected the leader of a major political party. She headed the Swedish Centre Party from 1985 to 1987. She was also one of the first female foreign ministers in the world.

Biography
Söder was born in Frykerud in Kil Municipality, Värmland. Having graduated from secondary school in Gothenburg, she studied in Falun, and worked as a teacher, first in Värmland and later in Täby, north of Stockholm, where she was a member of the local council from 1963 to 1971. She also sat on the Stockholm County Council from 1969 to 1973.  She died in Täby in 2015.

Political career

Ascendancy
In 1971, Söder was elected a Member of the Swedish Parliament, a position she held until 1991. The same year she became a member of parliament, she also became the second vice leader of the Centre Party. When Sweden got a centre-right government under Centre Party Prime Minister Thorbjörn Fälldin in 1976, she was named Minister for Foreign Affairs, the first woman ever to hold the post in Sweden. Söder's party left the government in 1978 over a conflict on nuclear power, and she was succeeded by liberal Hans Blix.  In 1979 the Centre Party rejoined the coalition, and Söder returned to the Cabinet as Minister of Health and Social Affairs in 1979. The same year she was promoted to the post as the party's first vice leader. She held her ministerial post until the centre-right coalition lost the 1982 elections to the Social Democrats.

Leader of the Centre Party
In 1985, when Thorbjörn Fälldin stepped down after an unsuccessful election, she finally reached the highest position in her party, making the Centre Party the first major Swedish party to be headed by a woman. Her time at the top would however be short. Due to health reasons, she left the party leadership in 1987, succeeded by Olof Johansson.

Other positions

During her years in politics, she also held posts as chairperson of Save the Children Sweden 1983–1995 and as President of the Nordic Council 1984–1985 and 1989–1990. She has also served as a member of several company boards, including Skandia and Wermlandsbanken, as well as on the Board of the Royal Institute of Technology. She once again made political headlines in 2003, when she co-signed an article urging her fellow party members to vote Yes in the Swedish Euro referendum, opposing the official party line.

Despite her varied accomplishments, the political legacy Söder is most known for among Swedes may be the 1980 reform that shut the stores of Systembolaget, the national alcoholic beverage retailing monopoly, on Saturdays. The policy remained in place for many years, but was abolished in 2001.

Awards 
Söder was awarded the Illis quorum by the government of Sweden in 1991.

References

Further reading

External links 

1928 births
2015 deaths
Female foreign ministers
Members of the Riksdag from the Centre Party (Sweden)
Swedish Ministers for Foreign Affairs
Leaders of political parties in Sweden
Women members of the Riksdag
Women government ministers of Sweden
Swedish women diplomats
Swedish Ministers for Health
Swedish schoolteachers
20th-century Swedish women politicians
20th-century Swedish politicians
Recipients of the Illis quorum